Pokrovka is a rural locality (a selo) in Bakhmutsky Selsoviet, Kuyurgazinsky District, Bashkortostan, Russia. The population was 169 as of 2010. There are 2 streets.

Geography 
Pokrovka is located 9 km southeast of Yermolayevo (the district's administrative centre) by road. Krasny Vostok is the nearest rural locality.

References 

Rural localities in Kuyurgazinsky District